Irena Pavelková (born 5 September 1974, in Mladá Boleslav) is a Czech slalom canoeist who competed at the international level from 1990 to 2012.

She won seven medals in the K1 team event at the ICF Canoe Slalom World Championships with three golds (2003, 2005, 2010) and four silvers (2002, 2006, 2007, 2011).

She is the overall World Cup champion from 1997. She also won a total of 11 medals at the European Championships (4 golds, 3 silvers and 4 bronzes).

Pavelková also competed in three Summer Olympics, earning her best finish of fifth in the K1 event in Sydney in 2000.

World Cup individual podiums

1 European Championship counting for World Cup points
2 Pan American Championship counting for World Cup points

References

2010 ICF Canoe Slalom World Championships 11 September 2010 K1 women's team final results. - accessed 11 September 2010.

Yahoo! Sports Athens 2004 profile

1974 births
Czech female canoeists
Canoeists at the 1996 Summer Olympics
Canoeists at the 2000 Summer Olympics
Canoeists at the 2004 Summer Olympics
Living people
Olympic canoeists of the Czech Republic
Medalists at the ICF Canoe Slalom World Championships
Sportspeople from Mladá Boleslav